Barthélemy Pouliot (October 15, 1811 – February 26, 1890) was a Quebec businessman and political figure. He represented L'Islet in the 1st Canadian Parliament as a Conservative member.

He was born in Saint-Jean on the Île d'Orléans in 1811 and was educated at Quebec City. He became a merchant in L'Islet-sur-Mer. Pouliot was one of the founders of the Québec, Chaudière, Maine and Portland Railway. He also served as justice of the peace. In 1854, he was elected to the Legislative Assembly of the Province of Canada for Dorchester. Pouliot was elected to the House of Commons in 1867; his election was annulled after an appeal but he was reelected in an 1869 by-election.

He died at L'Islet in 1890.

Electoral record 

By-election: On Mr. Pouliot being unseated on petition

External links

1811 births
1890 deaths
Members of the Legislative Assembly of the Province of Canada from Canada East
Conservative Party of Canada (1867–1942) MPs
Members of the House of Commons of Canada from Quebec
Canadian justices of the peace